Unturned is a free-to-play survival game by Smartly Dressed Games, a studio consisting solely of Canadian game designer Nelson Sexton. It was released for Windows, macOS, and Linux in July 2017. Unturned allows players to create custom maps using an in-game editor. Cosmetics and mods can also be created using the game's Unity engine, which allows them to publish creations on the Steam Workshop. A retail version of the game was released for the PlayStation 4 and Xbox One by 505 Games in November 2020.

Gameplay

Unturned features several different game modes, all of which consist of the same basic concept of zombie survival. The game also has multiple difficulty settings.

In the survival game mode, the player's character is spawned on a game map with clothes depending on their skill set.  Players must find weapons and supplies to survive against the zombies. As the player progresses through the game, they gain experience points which can then be used for upgrades or, on certain maps, as a currency for trading. Survival mode is also available in multiplayer. The greater aim is to survive, but the players may team-up or fight each other. Players must keep up their health, food and water, and radiation levels. Radiation damage can be obtained from getting hit by zombies or entering "deadzones" without proper hazmat protection. The game's multiplayer option has created a platform for multiple kinds of gameplay, such as survival, roleplay, creative, paintball and a battle royale like arena style arena matches. The game has a chance to give players a cosmetic item, like clothing or effects for their character, or camouflage or skins for weapons. Players can purchase keys, cases, and other items from the Steam Market.
The game supports the use of the steam workshop to add custom items, vehicles, armor, and weapons to either enhance or change the basic experience. Many popular user-created maps are curated, and many custom skins for items in the base game are added with updates. However, although the game supports mods, the game's files are closed source and players cannot add new categories of assets, they instead must place their creations in an already existing category.

The game has several maps available. Arena game mode is for multiplayer only. Players are spawned in the middle of a map with supplies and weapons scattered around. The winner is the last person, or the last team, alive. Players may die due to being slain by other players or by crossing the boundaries of the map. The game will also spawn helpful items like armor, attachments for guns, and the 3 types of health items. These items are essential, as the game has an intense bleeding out mechanic that can finish a player without medical supplies. The game will also spawn vehicles, which can enable players to avoid the border or roadkill other players. The arena mode grants a massive advantage to teams in arena mode. Since there is no separated solo/squad modes, solo players will be up against teams who can aid each other. The game does not require teams to fight each other, so multiple players can win.

Plot
The game's story is spread out across all of its maps. On the Washington map, there is a lab belonging to a company known as Scorpion-7. Outside the lab, there is an overrun military unit and within the building, in the basement, there are canisters containing zombies in stasis, one of which is broken. An apology note can also be found in which it appears the writer was attacked before the note was completed. It is assumed that this lab was ground zero for the start of the outbreak. The exact origin and the cause of the outbreak remain vague, but it is heavily implied that the virus was inadvertently created through bioweapons research the company was conducting, and the outbreak was caused by the escape of a test subject from their containment. The player is introduced as one of the few survivors, alluding to the idea that the player has not "turned" into a zombie. The player can help the Coalition, the organization fighting the outbreak and locating survivors.

Development
Unturned was developed by Nelson Sexton, an indie game developer from Calgary, Canada. He was only sixteen years old at the time of Unturned first release. Sexton started his career with Roblox, creating two of the most-popular games on the platform at that time, Battlefield and Deadzone. Deadzone was a zombie-survival game similar to Unturned. Neither of Nelson's original Roblox games are still on Roblox, they were both made private due to Roblox being flooded with copies of both very popular games and security issues.  Before Unturned was on Steam, it was played on web browsers and officially known as 'Unturned 1.0'. 

Unturned was originally listed on Steam Greenlight as 'Unturned 2.0' in May 2014. The game was released out of early access on July 7, 2017. Sexton plans to create a sequel to the game named Unturned II using Unreal Engine. The development of the sequel has since been put on hold.

Reception
According to gaming website Kotaku, Unturned was one of the most-popular games on Steam in mid-2014. Both Kotaku and Rock, Paper, Shotgun characterized the game's popularity as unexpected, since the game is mainly developed by a single person without a major studio's resources. PC Gamer said that while Unturned had few real ideas on its own, it was a "simple, accessible survival-simulator" that players may enjoy provided they could "stomach the low production values". In October 2022 the game broke its peak lifetime player count record with 93,161 concurrent players.

The launch of the console port of Unturned came with poor reception as the trailer was very disconnected from the actual game.

References

External links

2014 video games
Multiplayer and single-player video games
Online games
Windows games
MacOS games
Linux games
PlayStation 4 games
Video games with Steam Workshop support
Open-world video games
Indie video games
Video games developed in Canada
Video games set in Canada
Video games about zombies
Video games containing loot boxes
Video games with customizable avatars
Video games set in Germany
Video games set in Russia
Video games set in Washington (state)
Xbox One games
Xbox Series X and Series S games
Roblox
Survival video games
Free-to-play video games
505 Games games